OOM or oom may refer to:


Science and technology
 Out of memory, a pathological state of a computer operation
 Object-oriented modeling, a modeling paradigm mainly used in computer programming
 Order of magnitude, a measurement term
 OnePoint Operations Manager (OOM), Mission Critical Software's predecessor of Microsoft's System Center Operations Manager

Geography
 Oom Bay, Mac. Robertson Land, Antarctica
 Oom Island, Mac. Robertson Land, Antarctica

Other uses
 Pierre Bernard (yogi) (1875–1955), known as "The Great Oom", "The Omnipotent Oom" and "Oom the Magnificent", a pioneering American yogi, scholar, occultist, philosopher, mystic and businessman
 Order of Myths, an Alabama Mardi Gras organization
 Officer of the Order of Merit of the Police Forces post-nominal letters (OOM)
 "Out of Mana", a track from the album Science Fiction by Brand New
 Oom, a villain character; see List of Batman: The Brave and the Bold characters
 Odyssey of the Mind (OoM), a creative problem-solving competition
 Zoom Airlines (ICAO code)
 OOM, IATA airport code of Cooma–Snowy Mountains Airport, Cooma, New South Wales, Australia
 OOM (Optimal Online Marketing), a digital marketing company based in Singapore

See also
 Ooms, a Dutch language surname